The Omen Machine is Terry Goodkind's 12th novel, and the first in a new series about Richard and Kahlan. Events in the book take place directly after the end of Confessor.

Plot summary 
Richard and Kahlan are contentedly enjoying Cara's marriage when a boy named Henrik warns them of dark things to come before scratching them both and running away. Soon after, Cara warns Richard that something or someone was watching her in her room. At first unbelieving, Richard and Kahlan notice the same spooky presence on their own. Shortly after these events, prophecies are given by the most unexpected places and people, but appear equally in a book titled End Notes. After failing to reason with the delegates alarmed by these prophecies, Kahlan and Nicci frighten them into silence with a prediction invented by themselves. Meanwhile, Richard finds a strange machine underground, bearing an emblem exactly as on a wordbook for translating the language of creation, only reversed. It is later revealed that this machine is the source of all the new and strange predictions, and may be an artificial intelligence. Among the delegates is Abbot Dreier, the representative of Bishop Hannis Arc of Saavedra, who becomes the antagonist of this book and its sequels.

The scratch on Kahlan's arm worsens, and Zedd fails to heal it. When Kahlan feverishly wakes from a rest, she finds a pack of dogs surrounding her. A fight and chase then ensues until Kahlan runs away in a carriage. When Richard finds out that Kahlan is gone, he traces her footsteps and sends soldiers to find her. She is ultimately captured by a monstrous 'Hedge Maid': a macabre sorceress associated with necromancy. Richard tries to save Kahlan, but is himself captured. Richard remembers the machine's last warning, protects his and Kahlan's ears, and cuts the leather strips on the Hedge Maid's mouth, whereupon she emits a terrible shriek and dies. Richard and Kahlan are found by Nicci and Zedd, who take them to the Garden of Life to heal them.

Characters
Richard Rahl, major character in The Omen Machine and protagonist in The Sword of Truth series.
Kahlan Amnell, major character in The Omen Machine and in The Sword of Truth series.
Zeddicus Zu'l Zorander ("Zedd"), major character in The Sword of Truth series, who is a wizard and Richard Rahl's maternal grandfather.
Cara, major character in The Sword of Truth series, who is a Mord-Sith and Richard Rahl's bodyguard and confidante.
Nicci, a main character in later The Sword of Truth books, a powerful sorceress, former Sister of the Dark, and friend to Richard, Kahlan, and Zedd.
Nathan Rahl, a supporting character in The Sword of Truth series, powerful wizard who is over a millennium in age, the last living prophet, and distant ancestor of Richard Rahl.
Commander General Benjamin Meiffert, a supporting character in The Sword of Truth series, who is a general in the D'Haran army and Cara's husband.
Hannis Arc, Ruler of Falijn Province and the main antagonist in The Omen Machine.
Jit, a Hedge Maid introduced in The Omen Machine.
Abbot Ludwig Dreier, the right hand of Hannis Arc.
Vika, a Mord-Sith commanded by Hannis Arc.

Cover art
The cover art for The Omen Machine was created by Robert Anderson.

External links
 Official Terry Goodkind website

The Sword of Truth books
2011 American novels
2011 fantasy novels
American fantasy novels
Tor Books books